Julius Kaggwa is a prominent Ugandan intersex and transgender activist and executive director of intersex support organization Support Initiative for People with atypical sex Development (SIPD). In 2010, Kaggwa was a joint winner of the Human Rights First Human Rights Award. The following year, he was a joint winner of the Human Rights Defenders Award.

Activism 

Kaggwa campaigns on health, support and human rights issues facing intersex people, and also gender non-conforming people, and against the Ugandan "Anti-homosexuality" Bill.

Kaggwa has described how intersex infants may be mutilated or terminated due to the stigma surrounding their birth, and mothers may be stigmatized. SIPD aims to change cultural attitudes, and support appropriate medical care. Intersex conditions are viewed as a medical issue, in contrast to homosexuality, but as a committed Christian, Kaggwa argues that violence and discrimination against LGBT people is incompatible with his faith. In 2016, Kaggwa described how increasing discrimination against LGBT people in Uganda has contributed to a lack of safety for intersex people.

Awards and recognition 

In 2010, Kaggwa was a joint winner of the Human Rights First 2010 Human Rights Award for his work leading the fight against an anti-homosexuality bill in Uganda, and helping to create a more tolerant environment for sexual minorities.

As a member of Uganda’s Civil Society Coalition on Human Rights and Constitutional Law, Kaggwa was a joint winner in the Human Rights Defenders Award, 2011.

Selected bibliography

References 

Living people
Intersex rights activists
Transgender rights activists
Ugandan LGBT rights activists
Intersex rights in Uganda
Year of birth missing (living people)
Intersex writers